James Augustus Stewart (November 24, 1808 – April 3, 1879) was an American politician and jurist.

Stewart was born at "Tobacco Stick" (now Madison) in Dorchester County, Maryland, and attended the local school.  He went on to study law in Baltimore, Maryland, was admitted to the bar in 1829, and commenced practice in Cambridge, Maryland.  In addition to law, Stewart also engaged in the building of ships and houses.  He was an unsuccessful candidate for election in 1838 to the Twenty-sixth Congress, and served as a member of the Maryland House of Delegates from 1843 to 1845.  Stewart was elected as a Democrat to the Thirty-fourth, Thirty-fifth, and Thirty-sixth Congresses, serving from March 4, 1855, to March 3, 1861.  During the Thirty-fifth Congress, Stewart served as chairman of the Committee on Patents.

Stewart was not a candidate for renomination to Congress in 1860, and resumed the practice of his profession in Cambridge.  He became a judge of the Maryland Court of Appeals and served as chief justice of the circuit court from 1867 until his death in Cambridge.  Stewart is interred in Christ Protestant Episcopal Church Cemetery.

References

1808 births
1879 deaths
Democratic Party members of the Maryland House of Delegates
Judges of the Maryland Court of Appeals
People from Dorchester County, Maryland
Democratic Party members of the United States House of Representatives from Maryland
19th-century American politicians
19th-century American judges